Bregninge may refer to:

 Bregninge, Svendborg Municipality, a village on the island of Tåsinge, Denmark
 Bregninge Kirke, a church on Tåsinge, and Bregninge Hill, the location of the church
 Bregninge Church, Ærø, Denmark
 Bregninge School, a listed building in Guldborgsund Municipality, Denmark